Tell Chuera is an ancient Near Eastern tell site in Raqqa Governorate, northern Syria. It lies between the Balikh and Khabur rivers.

Archaeological research
The site was first described by Max von Oppenheim in 1913. Excavations were begun in 1958 by a team from the Free University of Berlin led by Anton Moortgat. These efforts continued until the late 1960s. With a new co-leader, Ursula Moortgat-Correns, digs occurred in 1973, 1974 and 1976. At the top of the mound three buildings of undressed stone were found (Steinbau I, II, and III) and in the center a mudbrick temple building (Kleiner Antentempe). The temple had a processional way "lined with rough, megalithic stone stelai". After a 5 year hiatus caused by the death of Anton Moortgat in 1977 work resumed in 1982. Two teams worked at the site, one under the direction of Winfried Orthmann of the University of Halle and the other under Ursula Moortgat-Correns, until 1998. Excavation then was taken up by a team from the Goethe University Frankfurt, under the direction of Professor Jan-Waalke Meyer from 1998 to 2005.

Tell Chuera and its environment

Occupation history
Originally occupied during the 4th millennium, Tell Chuera became a major site in the 3rd millennium during the Early Dynastic period. It reached its peak around 2350 BC and was then abandoned for reasons as yet unknown. A small settlement was built on the location by the Assyrians during the 2nd millennium. While the early name for the city is unknown, during Middle Assyrian times it was known as Harbe.

See also
Cities of the ancient Near East
Tell Beydar
Tell Brak
Tell Khoshi

References

Further reading
Joachim Bretschneider, Jan Driessen and Karel van Lerberghe, Power and architecture: monumental public architecture in the Bronze Age, David Brown, 2007, 
Dibo, Suzanne, "L’architecture Monumentale De Tell Chuera: Des Temples Ou Des Bâtiments Administratifs ?", Syria, vol. 93, pp. 235–54, 2016
HROUDA, B., "Bericht Über Die Ausgrabung (Tell Chuera)", Revue d’Assyriologie et d’archéologie Orientale, vol. 58, no. 4, pp. 183–84, 1964
Stefan Jakob, "Die mittelassyrischen Texte aus Tell Chuera in Nordost-Syrien", Harrassowitz Verlag, 2009, 
Krasnik, Klaus, and Jan-Waalke Meyer, "Im Tod Den Göttern Nahe: Eine Prunkvolle Bestattung in Tell Chuera, Nordsyrien", Antike Welt, vol. 32, no. 4, pp. 383–90, 2001
Jan-Waalke Meyer, "Ausgrabungen in Tell Chuera in Nordost-Syrien Band 2: II: Vorbericht zu den Grabungskampagnen 1998 bis 2005", Harrassowitz Verlag, 2010, 
Moortgat-Correns, Ursula, "'Tell Chuēra.' Archiv Für Orientforschung", vol. 35, pp. 153–63, 1988
Winfried Orthmann, "L'architecture religieuse de Tell Chuera", Akkadica, vol. 69, pp. 1–18, 1990
W. Orthmann, "The Origins of Tell Chuera," in The Origins of Cities in Dry Farming Syria and Mesopotamia in the Third Millennium B.C., ed. H. Weiss (Guilford, Conn.: Four Quarters Publishing, 1986),
Michael Zick: "Tell Chuera – Stadtplanung vor 5000 Jahren". in: "Bild der Wissenschaft." Leinefelden-Echterdingen 1/2005,1, S. 72–76.

External links
Universität Frankfurt zu den Ausgrabungen von Tell Chuera
Institut für Orientalische Archäologie und Kunst der Universität Halle
1996 field season
1997 field season
1998/99 field season

24th-century BC disestablishments
Populated places established in the 3rd millennium BC
Populated places disestablished in the 3rd millennium BC
Bronze Age sites in Syria
Archaeological sites in Raqqa Governorate
Neolithic sites in Syria
Tells (archaeology)
Early Dynastic Period (Mesopotamia)